Raj Bahadur Buda Chhetri is a Nepalese politician, belonging to the Nepal Communist Party currently serving as the member of the 1st Federal Parliament of Nepal. In the 2017 Nepalese general election he was elected from the Dailekh 2 constituency, securing 23323 (52.94%) votes.

References

Nepal MPs 2017–2022
Living people
Members of the 1st Nepalese Constituent Assembly
Communist Party of Nepal (Unified Marxist–Leninist) politicians
Nepal Workers Peasants Party politicians
1966 births